Giggleswick, a village and civil parish in the Craven district of North Yorkshire, England, lies on the B6480 road, less than  north-west of the town of Settle and divided from it by the River Ribble. It is the site of Giggleswick School. The village belonged to the West Riding of Yorkshire until 1974.

Etymology
A Dictionary of British Place Names contains the entry:
Giggleswick N. Yorks. Ghigeleswic 1086 (DB). "Dwelling or (dairy) farm of a man called Gikel or Gichel". OE or ME pers. name (probably a short form of the biblical name Judichael) + wīc.

Railway station

The village is served by Giggleswick railway station, which provides services to Leeds and to Lancaster and Morecambe. There are five trains a day in each direction, operated by Northern.

Close to the station and opposite the Craven Arms Hotel (formerly the Old Station Inn) is the Plague Stone. This has a shallow trough, which in times of plague was filled with vinegar to sterilize the coins that were left by townspeople as payment for food brought from surrounding farms. The stone was moved a short distance from its original site when the Settle bypass was built.

Church of St Alkelda
The parish church is dedicated to St Alkelda, an obscure Anglo-Saxon saint associated with the North Yorkshire town of Middleham. The building dates mostly from the 15th century, but carved stones discovered during the restoration of 1890–1892 showed that a building existed on the site before the Norman Conquest. It has been classed by English Heritage as a Grade I listed building. The restoration, carried out by the Lancaster architects Paley, Austin and Paley, included replacing the roof, removing the gallery, rebuilding the vestry, and reseating, replastering and reflooring the church.

Notable people

 Richard Whiteley of Channel 4's Countdown was a pupil at Giggleswick School. In his will he left the school £500,000, which was used to build a new theatre named after him.

 Russell Harty was an English teacher at the same time as Whiteley was a pupil.
 The operatic soprano Sarah Fox was born in the village and attended Giggleswick School.
 The Star Wars actor Anthony Daniels also attended Giggleswick School.
 The film and stage actor Clarence Blakiston (1864–1943) was born in Giggleswick, as was Henry Maudsley, the pioneering British psychiatrist, at a farm outside Giggleswick in 1835.
 The Victorian-era actor Sir John Hare was born in the town in 1844.
 Professor Sir Nevill Francis Mott, who won the Nobel prize in physics in 1977, was born in Leeds and brought up in Giggleswick.
 Television chef Susan Brookes is a former resident of the village, having resided there in the 1980s.

Tourist attractions
Giggleswick is notable amongst rock climbers for a limestone crag, retro-bolted with many sports routes during 2005 and 2006. The crag is opposite Settle Golf Club on the B6480, north of Giggleswick.

In the media
An episode of the radio comedy The Shuttleworths was set in Giggleswick. Comedy writers Ray Galton and Alan Simpson used the town as their emblem of a travelling actor's date with obscurity in Hancock's Half Hour, The Train Journey episode, broadcast on 23 October 1959. Les Dawson did the same in 1975, in Dawson's Weekly. In 1989, the TV series Capstick's Law, focusing on a family law firm in the 1950s, used Russell Harty's old cottage as a venue. The TV series 24seven was filmed at Giggleswick School.

1927 eclipse
Among few observers of a 24-second solar eclipse in 1927 were members of the Astronomer Royal's expedition to Giggleswick.

See also
Castleberg Hospital

References

External links

Yorksview - Giggleswick
Giggleswick Primary School's Website
Giggleswick School Website
Walk book on history of Giggleswick
A video of the station added

Villages in North Yorkshire
Civil parishes in North Yorkshire
Ribblesdale